Celecoxib/tramadol sold under the brand name Seglentis, is a fixed-dose combination of the anti-inflammatory celecoxib and the opioid tramadol used for the management and treatment of pain.

Developed by Spanish pharmaceutical company Esteve, it was approved for medical use in the United States in October 2021.

References

External links 
 
 
 

Combination drugs
Nonsteroidal anti-inflammatory drugs
Opioids